The St. Scholastica's Academy or simply "St. Scho" is a private Catholic education institution run by the Congregation of the Missionary Benedictine Sisters of Tutzing in San Fernando City, Pampanga, Philippines. It was founded in June 1925 by the Benedictine Sisters.

History
St. Scholastica's Academy of Pampanga is the third Benedictine school established in the Philippines. Formerly known as the Assumption Academy, it was established in June 1925 in the house of the Singian family. The high school department was added in school year 1926-27. In March 1930, the first secondary graduates of the Assumption Academy were presented. The Alumni/Alumnae and present students of this school include sons/daughters and granddaughters/son of businessmen, politicians, and prominent figures in Pampanga.

Due to the large number of enrollees, and the zeal of its biggest benefactor, Monsignor Prudencio David, the school was relocated to its second site in 1931, and ownership of the school was passed on to the Benedictine Sisters in 1938. With the outbreak of World War II, the building was used as a military hospital. In 1966, the school was renamed St. Scholastica's Academy of Pampanga. The school was transferred to a bigger site in 1972, leaving the old building without occupants. This school is exclusively for girls only but, due to the clamor of the parents of the female students, now, St. Scholastica's Academy (SSA) is accepting boys but only for grade school. Though recently, the school has plans on removing its girls-exclusive title and accepting boys in high school. But this is yet to be decided and as of now, a survey was conducted among the grade school boys if they want to continue their high school studies in St. Scholastica's Academy.

In 1972, partly as a solution, the High School Department was transferred to the wide barren grounds in Cer-Hil, Quebiawan, five kilometers from the town proper. The previous match-like edifice has been expanded into an F-shaped building that houses the whole High School Department. A covered court with a stage, eating sheds, another building to house the Grade School Department and covered walks have been added through the combined efforts of the students, the alumnae, the PTA and the administration. On July 11, 1987, a building for the whole Grade School Department was blessed. The preschool later was transferred to a new building in 2001. The school has been recently renovated and the before F- shaped building of the high school department is now an E-shaped building to provide more classrooms for the students and on 2017 a new building was established to provide more rooms for the first batch of Grade 12 students.

Beset by continuing threat of natural calamities prompted by the eruption of Mount Pinatubo in 1991, SSA-SF was challenged to strengthen/further its social orientation through various curricular processes and continuing community involvement projects and activities.

In 1992, it opened its door and provided temporary office for the Social Action Center of Pampanga (SACOP) and in 1994, it housed the lahar victims coming from various towns of Pampanga. The year after, SSA-SF shared its campus with Don Bosco Academy, the school which was totally buried in lahar.

SSA-SF also suffered a tremendous drop in its enrollment in 1996 due to the devastation of lahar, but was able to recover the next year. Through all of these, SSA-SF continued its quest for excellence that in 1991, the High School Department was accredited by PAASCU and the Grade School Department in 2000 and 2014.

Grade school

The grade school's sections are named as follows:

 1st Grade: St. Agatha, St. Anne, St. Claire, St. Monica, St. Martha, St. Agnes, St. Cecilia
 2nd Grade: St. Peter, St. John, St. Mark, St. Matthew, St. Thomas, St. Andrew, St. Paul
 3rd Grade: St. Benedict, St. Joseph, St. Ignatius, St. Francis, St. Therese, St. Scholastica
 4th Grade: St. Boniface, St. Chrysostom, St. Bernard, St. Hilda, St. Odo, St. Placid, St. Maurus
 5th Grade: St. Camillus, St. Cyril, St. Celestine, St. Cyprian, St. Ireneaus, St. Clement, St. Otilia
 6th Grade: St. Lorenzo, St. Stephen, St. Gertrude, St. Augustine, St. Vincent, St. Lucy, St. Anthony

High school

The high school's sections are named as follows:

 7th Grade: Women in the Bible (Deborah, Esther, Judith, Miriam, Naomi, Ruth)
 8th Grade: Young Women Saints (St. Agnes, St. Bernadette, St. Cecilia, St. Clare, St. Ma. Goretti, St. Therese)
 9th Grade: Titles of Mary (Fatima, Guadalupe, Lourdes, Manaoag, Peñafrancia, Remedies)
 10th Grade: Great Benedictine Women (St. Elfreda, St. Gertrude, St. Hildegarde, St. Humbeline, St. Mechtilde, St. Odilia)
11th Grade: STEM (St. Celestine, St. Frances), ABM (St. Beatrice, St. Aurea), GAS (St. Elizabeth)
12th Grade: St. Amalberga, St. Ehrentrundis, St. Hildegundis, St. Martha and St. Monica 
Due to the short number of 8th grade students in the school year 2015–2016, the number of 8th grade sections were reduced to 6.

In the school year 2017–2018, St. Elizabeth was removed due to depleted number of students in Grade 11 and only St. Amalberga is the pure STEM stranded section while the other four sections in Grade 12 are mixed STEM and ABM sections. 

In the school year 2016–2017, the school planned to expand its offered tracks in senior high school in the proceeding school year and as promised, for the next school year, General Academics (GA) and Humanities and Social Sciences (HUMSS) are now added for the senior high school.

Benedictine motto
 Ora et Labora
 "Prayer and Work"

Academics
SSA-SF is LEVEL 3 PAASCU-accredited and is also one of the prominent and top academic institutions in the Philippines.

Affiliations
It is a member of the Association of Benedictine Schools (ABS),
the Philippine Accrediting Association of Schools, Colleges and Universities (PAASCU) and Women's National Collegiate Association (WNCAA)- Central Luzon

General regulations
 Flag Ceremony and Morning Praise
 Prayer before, during and after Class
 Campus Security
 I.D. (Identification Card)
 Gate Pass
 Attendance
 Daily Class Schedule

Facilities
 St. Scholastica's Chapel
 Libraries
 Audio Visual Centers
 Science Laboratories (specifically Physics Laboratory, Chemistry Laboratory, Biology Laboratory and Earth Science Laboratory in the High School)
 Clinic
 School Store
 Computer Laboratories
 Amrhein Hall
 St. Cecilia's Covered Court
 Dance Studio
 Swimming Pool
 Music Room
 Kiosks
 H.E. (Home Economics) Room
 Art Room
 Sewing Room
 Recording Booth

Student activities
 Retreats and Recollections
 Extra and Co-Curricular Activities
 School Publications 
 Guidelines for Participation in Activities
 Organizations or Club Activities
 Class Activity
 Social Involvement Program
 Catechesis

Subjects

Academics
 Science
 Araling Panlipunan
 Filipino
 English (High School Students)
 Reading (Grade School Pupils)
 Language (Grade School Pupils)
 Mother Tongue (exclusively for grades 1-3 students)
 Mathematics
 CLE (Christian Living Education)

Non-Academics
 Home Economics and Living Education (Grades 4-6)
 Sewing and Handicrafts (Grade 7)
 Food and Home Management (Grade 8)
 Baking and Pastry Production (Grade 9)
 P.E. (Physical Education)
 English Speech (Grade 9)
 Music
 Computer (ICT or Information Communication Technology in High School)
 Arts 
 Visual Arts (Grade 7 and Grade 8 students)
 Bookkeeping (exclusively for Grade 9 students)
 Business Arts (exclusively for Grade 10 students)
 Swimming (exclusively for grade 7 and Grade 8 students)
 Art Technology (exclusively for Grade 10 students)

Clubs in Grade School

CLE-related Clubs:
 Knights of the Blessed Sacrament
 Benedictine Circle

English-related Clubs:
 Booklovers
 Speech and Drama Club

Filipino-related Clubs:
 SALAKOT
 KASAPI

Math-related Clubs:
 Junior Math Wizards (Gr.3&4)
 Math Wizards (Gr.5&6)
 Cyberkada (Gr. 3-6)

Science-related Clubs: 
 Junior Earth Keepers (Gr.3&4)
 Earth Keepers (Gr.5&6)

Araling Panlipunan-related Clubs:
 Kamalayang Panlipunan
 Kapampangan Club
 Scouting Movement

Music-related Clubs:
 Junior Glee Club (Gr.3&4)
 Glee Club (Gr.5&6)
 Guitar Club
 Drum and Lyre

Arts-related Clubs:
 Art Club (Gr.3&4)
 Likhang Kamay (Gr.5&6)

Sports-related Clubs:
 Sports Club (Gr.3&4)
 Basketball Club for boys
 Volleyball Club
 Badminton Club

H.E.L.E.-related Clubs:
 Future Homemakers

Other Clubs:
 The Little Blue Quill
 Junior Assembly
 Academic Club (Gr.5&6)

Clubs in High School
Religious Clubs:
 PAX BENEDICTINA
 Magnificat
Academic Clubs:
 MATHRIX Circle
 SciEarTech Movement
Socio-Civic Clubs:
 Earth Savers' Club
 KAMPIL (Kamalayang Pilipino)
 Young Women's Club
Communication/Literary Arts Clubs:
 Blue Quill
 Speech and Drama Club
 SESFIL (Samahan ng mga Eskolastikan sa Filipino)
Special Interest Clubs
 Booktopia
 Cyberscho
 Homemakers' Club
 Likhang Kamay
Performing Arts Clubs
 Dance Ministry of SSA
 Glee Club
 Sports Clubs
 Badminton Club
 Basketball Club
 Swimming Club
 Volleyball Club
Other Special Interest Club:
 Peer Facilitating Circle

Student Council Organization (SCO)
The Student Council Organization is the representative of the secondary school students of St. Scholastica's Academy. It is composed of the SCO officers (President, Vice-President for External Affairs, Vice-President for Internal Affairs, Secretary, Treasurer, Auditor, PRO) and Class Presidents and Secretaries.

The SCO makes the rules and regulations needed to carry out its objectives but subjects to the approval of the High School Principal.

It shall enact measures that complement and supplement the work in school and serve as the coordinating body of all student organizations.

Publications
 The Little Blue Quill (Grade School's Official Publication)
 The Blue Quill (High School's Official Publication)

Notable alumnae
 Helen Nicolette Henson-Hizon - model, Bb.Pilipinas 2nd Runner-up, (now in: OFW Staten Island, New York)
Jayann Bautista - singer, Pinoy Idol 1st Runner-up
 Lot D. Hilvano - interior designer, Professional Regulation Commission Board of Interior Design, Presidential Appointee

Catholic elementary schools in the Philippines
Catholic secondary schools in the Philippines
Schools in San Fernando, Pampanga